Saiyad Usman Mosque, alternatively spelled as Syed or Saiyyed, also known as Usmanpura Dargah or Roza or Saiyad Oosman Mausoleum, is a medieval tomb and mosque in Usmanpura, Ahmedabad, India.

History 
Saiyid Usmān, also known as Sham-i-Burhāni was a disciple and successor of Qutub-ul Ālam, aka Saiyad Burhān-ud-din. Saiyid Usmān was a prominent Sufi saint, and lived along with his teacher in the village of Vatva outside Ahmedabad. As Saiyid Usmān became attracted more followers, Usmān moved out and founded Usmānpur village. Saiyid Usmān died in 1459 and the mausoleum dedicated to him was built by Sultan Mahmud Begada in 1460. It is architecturally similar to Ganj Baksh tomb at Sarkhej Roza.

During the British Raj, Major Cole spend Rs. 7,500 for the mosque's restoration.

The mosque was heavily damaged in 2001 Gujarat earthquake but was restored by Archaeological Survey of India in 2009.

Architecture 
The mosque, with a minaret at each end, is in the style of the Sarkhej Roza. The mosque is a pure Hindu style without an arch. Inside, the arrangement of pillars, is neither so simple nor so clear as at Sarkhej. One peculiarity of tho tomb is that its dome is supported on twelve instead of on eight pillars. This change gives much variety and the tomb is altogether the most successful sepulchral design carried out in the pillared style at Ahmedabad.

Gallery

References 

Mosques in Ahmedabad
Religious buildings and structures completed in 1460
Monuments of National Importance in Gujarat